Essam Yassin Abbas (born March 11, 1987 in Iraq) is an Iraqi football player, who currently plays for Al-Shorta SC in Iraq.

Style of play
Essam a complete and dominant defender, who influential at club, His technical, defensive and athletic ability made him a versatile player from a tactical standpoint, and allowed him to be deployed also as a fullback or even as a sweeper.

Honours

Club
Naft Al-Wasat
Iraqi Premier League:  2014–15
Al-Hudood SC

2021–22 Iraq Division One

External links
 Defender Award on Youtube.com
 Top Goal on Youtube.com

Goalzz.com

1987 births
Living people
Iraqi footballers
Iraq international footballers
2009 FIFA Confederations Cup players
Expatriate footballers in Syria
Iraqi expatriate footballers
Amanat Baghdad players
Al-Shorta SC players
Association football defenders
Syrian Premier League players